In the mathematical fields of differential geometry and geometric analysis, the Gauss curvature flow is a geometric flow for oriented hypersurfaces of Riemannian manifolds. In the case of curves in a two-dimensional manifold, it is identical with the curve shortening flow. The mean curvature flow is a different geometric flow which also has the curve shortening flow as a special case.

Definition and well-posedness
Let  be a smooth -dimensional manifold and let  be a smooth Riemannian manifold of dimension .

The equation defining the Gauss curvature flow is

So a Gauss curvature flow consists of a smooth manifold , a smooth Riemannian manifold  of dimension one larger, and a one-parameter family of immersions of  into , together with a smooth unit normal vector field along each immersion, such that the above equation is satisfied.

The well-posedness of the Gauss curvature flow is settled if  is closed. Then, if  is greater than one, and if a given immersion, along which a smooth unit normal vector field has been chosen, has positive-definite second fundamental form, then there is a unique solution of the Gauss curvature flow with "initial data" . If  is equal to one, so that one is in the setting of the curve shortening flow, the condition on the second fundamental form is unnecessary.

Convergence theorems
Due to the existence & uniqueness theorem above, the Gauss curvature flow has essentially only been studied in the cases of curve shortening flow, and in higher dimensions for closed convex hypersurfaces. Regardless of dimension, it has been most widely studied in the case that  is the Euclidean space .

In the case of curve shortening flow, Michael Gage and Richard Hamilton showed that any convex embedding of the circle into the plane is deformed to a point in finite time, in such a way that rescalings of the curves in the flow smoothly approach a round circle. This was enhanced by a result of Matthew Grayson showing that any embedded circle in the plane is deformed into a convex embedding, at which point Gage and Hamilton's result applies. Proofs have since been found which do not treat the two cases of convexity and non-convexity separately. In the more general setting of a complete two-dimensional Riemannian manifold which has a certain convexity near infinity, Grayson proved the convergence to a closed geodesic or to a round point.

Kaising Tso applied the methods of Shiu-Yuen Cheng and Shing-Tung Yau's resolution of the Minkowski problem to study the higher-dimensional version of Gage and Hamilton's result. In particular, he cast the Gauss curvature flow as a parabolic Monge–Ampère equation for the support function of the hypersurfaces. He was able to show that the maximal time of existence is an explicit constant multiple of the volume enclosed by the initial hypersurface, and that each hypersurface in the flow is smooth and strictly convex, with diameter converging to zero as the time approaches its maximum.

The key of his proof was an application of the maximum principle to the quantity , showing that the largest size of the point-by-point difference of the two eigenvalues of the shape operator cannot be increasing in time. Previous results of Andrews for convex hypersurfaces of Euclidean space, as well as a Li–Yau Harnack inequality found by Bennett Chow, then applied to obtain uniform geometric control over the surfaces comprising the flow. The full convergence to the sphere made use of the Krylov–Safonov theorem.

References

Sources 

 

 

Differential geometry